Microtis alboviridis, commonly known as the scented mignonette orchid or ghost mignonette orchid is a species of orchid endemic to the south-west of Western Australia. It has a single hollow, onion-like leaf and up to forty or more small, greenish-white, sweetly scented flowers. It is similar to the white mignonette orchid (M. alba) but has smaller flowers and flowers abundantly in the absence of fire.

Description
The flowers are similar to those of Microtis alba, but apart from being small, the flowers have an upturned tip on the labellum and the labellum has smaller lobes. Flowering occurs from November to December and is not stimulated by fire the previous summer.

Taxonomy and naming
Microtis alboviridis was first formally described in 2008 by Robert John Bates and the description was published in The Orchadian. The specific epithet (alboviridis) is derived from the Latin words albus meaning "white" and viridis meaning "green".

Distribution and habitat
The scented mignonette orchid is found in a range of habitats from seasonally wet flats to forest and occurs between Mount Lesueur and Israelite Bay, sometimes growing in populations of thousands of individuals.

Conservation
Microtis alboviridis is classified as "not threatened" by the Western Australian Government Department of Parks and Wildlife.

References

External links
 

alboviridis
Endemic orchids of Australia
Orchids of Western Australia
Plants described in 2008